is a Japanese speed skater. She competed in the women's 3000 metres at the 2010 Winter Olympics.

References

External links

1985 births
Living people
Japanese female speed skaters
Olympic speed skaters of Japan
Speed skaters at the 2010 Winter Olympics
Sportspeople from Nagano Prefecture
Universiade medalists in speed skating
Universiade bronze medalists for Japan
Speed skaters at the 2007 Winter Universiade
Medalists at the 2007 Winter Universiade
21st-century Japanese women